The 1954 Segunda División de Chile was the third season of the Segunda División de Chile.

O'Higgins Braden was the tournament's winner.

Table

See also
Chilean football league system

References

External links
 RSSSF 1954

Segunda División de Chile (1952–1995) seasons
Primera B
Chil